Periaptodes testator is a species of beetle in the family Cerambycidae. It was described by Francis Polkinghorne Pascoe in 1866. It is known from Indonesia, Papua New Guinea, and possibly also Australia.

References

Lamiini
Beetles described in 1866